Lane Cove is an electoral district of the Legislative Assembly in the Australian state of New South Wales. It is represented by Anthony Roberts of the Liberal Party. The electoral district of Lane Cove encompasses the suburbs and localities of Artarmon, Chatswood West, East Ryde, Gladesville, Gore Hill, Greenwich, Henley, Hunters Hill, Huntleys Point, Lane Cove, Linley Point, Longueville, Macquarie Park, Monash Park, North Ryde, Northwood, Putney, Riverview, Ryde, St Leonards, Tambourine Bay and Woolwich.

Members for Lane Cove

Election results

References

External links

Lane Cove
1904 establishments in Australia
Lane Cove
1904 disestablishments in Australia
Lane Cove
1913 establishments in Australia
Lane Cove